Jason Moloney (born 10 January 1991) is an Australian professional boxer who challenged twice for the IBF bantamweight title. At regional level, he has held the WBA Oceania bantamweight title since 2017 and held the Commonwealth bantamweight title in 2018. As an amateur he represented Australia at the 2010 Commonwealth Games.

Amateur career

2010 Commonwealth Games
Moloney competed in the men's flyweight division at the 2010 Commonwealth Games.

Moloney’s first fight of the competition was against Michael Conlan (Northern Ireland). He beat Conlan via a points decision on count-back, in one of the best fights of the tournament.

He would then go on to face Oteng Oteng (Botswana) in the men’s Quarterfinals, losing via a close points decision.

Professional career

Super bantamweight
Following the 2014 national amateur championships, Moloney turned professional in August 2014. Moloney made his professional debut against Chatri Sariphan on 15 August 2014. He won the fight by a first-round technical knockout. Moloney amassed a 5-0 record during the next year, before being scheduled to face Markquil Salvana for the vacant WBA Oceania super bantamweight title on 18 December 2015. Salvana retired from the fight at the end of the fifth round, due to swelling around his right eye. Moloney made his first WBA Oceania title defense against Junior Bajawa on 19 March 2016. He retained the belt by a fourth-round technical knockout.

After capturing his first professional title, Moloney was scheduled to face Matias Agustin Arriagada in a non-title bout on 20 May 2016. He won the fight by a fifth-round technical knockout. Moloney was scheduled to face Virden Rivera in another non-title bout on 24 June 2016. He won the fight by a third-round knockout. Moloney faced Jeffrey Francisco on 3 August 2016, in a yet another non-title bout. He won the fight by unanimous decision, with scores of 59-54, 59-54 and 60-53.

Moloney made his second WBA Oceania super bantamweight title defense against Gerpaul Valero on 8 October 2016, at the Melbourne Park in Melbourne, Australia. He won the fight by a seventh-round technical knockout. He was leading 60-53 on all three of the judges' scorecards at the time of the stoppage. Moloney made his third title defense against Enrique Bernache on 10 December 2016, with the fight once again taking place at the Melbourne Park in Melbourne, Australia. He won the fight by a sixth-round technical knockout. Bernache was deducted a point in the fifth round, due to repeated low blows.

Moloney faced Marco Demecillo in a non-title bout on 3 February 2017, in his first fight of the year. He won the fight by unanimous decision, with scores of 80-69, 80-71 and 80-70. Demecillo was deducted a point in the eight round for a low blow. Moloney made his fourth WBA Oceania title defense against Emanuel Armendariz on 3 June 2017. He won the fight by a fifth-round technical knockout, and was leading 40-36, 40-36 and 39-37 on the scorecards at the time of the stoppage. Moloney the fifth and final defense of his secondary WBA title against Lolito Sonsona on 19 August 2017. Aside from the WBA Oceania title, the vacant OPBF Silver title was likewise on the line. He won the fight by unanimous decision, with scores of 100-90, 99-91 and 100-90.

Bantamweight

WBA Oceania champion
After successfully defending the WBA Oceania super bantamweight title for the fifth time, Moloney moved down to bantamweight. Moloney was scheduled to face Julias Kisarawe for the vacant WBA Oceania bantamweight title on 21 October 2017, in his first fight at bantamweight. He won the fight by a first-round stoppage, knocking Kisarawe out with two seconds left in the round. Moloney made his first WBA Oceania bantamweight title defense against the one-time WBO title challenger Immanuel Naidjala on 24 February 2018, with the vacant Commonwealth bantamweight title being on the line as well. He won the fight by a third-round technical knockout, after winning the first two rounds on all three of the judges' scorecards. Moloney made his second WBA Oceania title defense against the former WBA super-flyweight titleholder Kohei Kono on 19 May 2018. He was awarded a stoppage victory after the sixth round, after the ringside doctor determined that a cut to the outside of Kono’s left eye was too severe for him to continue fighting.

Moloney vs. Rodríguez

Moloney participated in the second season of the World Boxing Super Series, which took place in October 2018 and November 2019, and focused on the bantamweight division. Moloney, at the time the IBF mandatory title challenger, faced the undefeated 18-0 IBF bantamweight champion Emmanuel Rodríguez in the tournament quarterfinals on 20 October 2018, at the Addition Financial Arena in Orlando, Florida. He lost the fight by split decision. Two of the judges scored the fight 115-113 for Rodríguez, while the third judge gave Moloney the identical scorecard. Moloney appeared to take the fight over as it neared the championship rounds, but was unable to overcome the points lead that Rodríguez had accumulated up to that point.

Continued WBA Oceania reign
Moloney made the third defense of his secondary title against Cris Paulino on 30 March 2019. He won the fight by a fifth-round technical knockout, stopping Paulino at the very last second of the round. Moloney made his fourth WBA Oceania title defense against Goodluck Mrema on 15 June 2019. He won the fight by a third-round knockout, flooring Mrema with a left hook at the 2:23 minute mark. Moloney made his fifth and final WBA Oceania title defense against the one-time WBC super-flyweight title challenger Dixon Flores on 15 November 2019. He won the fight by knockout, stopping Flores midway through the second round. Moloney faced Leonardo Baez in a stay-busy non-title bout on 25 June 2020. Baez retired from the fight at the end of the seventh round.

Moloney vs. Inoue
Moloney, at the time ranked #6 by The Ring and #1 by the WBO, was scheduled to challenge the reigning WBA (Super), IBF and The Ring bantamweight champion Naoya Inoue on 31 October 2020, at the MGM Grand Conference Center in Paradise, Nevada. Moloney stepped in as a replacement for the WBO bantamweight champion John Riel Casimero, who was forced to withdraw due to the COVID-19 pandemic. Moloney, who entered the bout as a +550 underdog, lost the fight by a late seventh-round knockout. Inoue first knocked Moloney down with a counter left hook in the sixth round, although he was able to recover from it. Moloney was once again knocked down in the seventh round, with a short right hook, and was unable to beat the ten count. He was outlanded by Inoue 107 to 62 in total punches and 63 to 32 in power punches landed. Moloney was losing on all three of the judges' scorecards at the time of the stoppage.

Continued bantamweight career
Moloney faced Joshua Greer Jr. for the vacant WBC Silver bantamweight title on 14 August 2021, at the Hard Rock Hotel & Casino in Tulsa, Oklahoma. The bout was scheduled for the undercard of the Joshua Franco and Andrew Moloney trilogy match, and was broadcast by ESPN. He won the fight by unanimous decision, with scores of 98-92, 98-92 and 96-94. Moloney called for a world title fight against either the WBC champion Nonito Donaire or John Riel Casimero in his post-fight interview.

Moloney made his first WBC Silver title defense against Aston Palicte on 5 June 2022, on the George Kambosos Jr. vs. Devin Haney undercard. Aside from the WBC Silver title, the vacant WBO International bantamweight title was on the line as well. He won the fight by a third-round knockout. Moloney first knocked Palicte down with a right straight, before finishing the fight with a flurry of punches at the 2:35 minute mark.

Personal life
Jason is a twin brother to Andrew Moloney, who is also a professional boxer.

Professional boxing record

References

External links
 
 Jason Moloney - Profile, News Archive & Current Rankings at Box.Live

1991 births
Living people
Bantamweight boxers
Super-bantamweight boxers
Boxers at the 2010 Commonwealth Games
Boxers from Melbourne
Australian male boxers
Commonwealth Games competitors for Australia
Twin sportspeople
Australian twins